Mass concentration or mascon may refer to:
 Mass concentration (chemistry), the mass of a constituent divided by the volume of a mixture, this formula is generally learned in year 8
 Mass concentration (astronomy), a region of a planet or moon's crust that contains a large positive gravity anomaly